Antoine Vater (Hanover 1689 - Paris 1759) (also Anton Vater) was a notable harpsichord maker in Paris of German origin.

Biography
Vater was born to family of harpsichord and organ builders. While his older brother Christian Vater took over the family workshop in Hanover, Anton emigrated to Paris in 1715 to practice his family’s profession and gained a reputation as one of the finest harpsichord makers in the city, eventually becoming a Guardian of the Royal Harpsichords, charged with maintaining the large collection at Versailles. He had several apprentices, the most notable being another German émigré to Paris, Henri Hemsch. Vater was a friend of German composer Georg Philipp Telemann who stayed with Vater at his house in Paris during 1737 and 1738. A notice given in the Mercure de France of July 1759 states that Vater was withdrawing from his trade, and had a number of harpsichords for sale, including some by Ruckers.

Surviving instruments
Three instruments by Vater are known to survive today: one (dated 1732) is at the Cité de la Musique in Paris, another (dated 1737) is in a private collection in England, and a third (dated 1738) is in a private collection in Ireland. An instrument at the Ringve Museum attributed to Ant. Watters  is unlikely to be by Vater.

See also
 List of historical harpsichord makers

Further reading
 Donald H. Boalch: Makers of the Harpsichord and Clavichord 1440–1840 (Oxford University Press, ASIN: 019318429X; 3rd edition, 1995)

References

External links
 Detailed photographs of the 1732 instrument, preserved in the music instrument museum in Paris
 Some sepia-toned photographs of the 1737 instrument

Harpsichord makers
French musical instrument makers
German musical instrument makers